Johann Karl Friedrich zu Carolath-Beuthen (sometimes called von Schoenaich-Carolath and sometimes Friedrich Johann Carl) (11 November 1716 in Carolath–10 February 1791) was an independent prince and Prussian general in the service of Frederick the Great.

He was a son of Prince Hans Carl zu Carolath-Beuthen and his wife, Countess Amalia zu Dohna-Schlodien.

Military service
In 1741, after service in the imperial army, Carolath-Beuthen entered Prussian service.  He was a lieutenant colonel in a life carabiner regiment.  In 1743, he was colonel and commander of the Curassier regiment Nr. 8. He served most notably at the Battle of Hohenfriedberg.  In the same year, Frederick awarded him the Order Pour le Mérite. In 1751 he received his own cuirassier regiment, No. 9., and began the Seven Years' War as a lieutenant general.

Citations

1716 births
1791 deaths
Prussian military personnel of the Seven Years' War
Recipients of the Pour le Mérite (military class)
Lieutenant generals of Prussia